During the afternoon rush hour of June 22, 2009, a subway train wreck occurred between two southbound Red Line Washington Metro trains in Northeast, Washington, D.C., United States. A moving train collided with a train stopped ahead of it; the train operator along with eight passengers died, and 80 people were injured, making it the deadliest crash in the history of the Washington Metro.

The National Transportation Safety Board (NTSB) investigation found that after a June 17 replacement of a track circuit component at what became the crash site, the track circuit had been suffering from parasitic oscillations which left it unable to reliably report when that stretch of track was occupied by a train. The struck train came to a stop because of traffic ahead. Because the entire train was within the faulty circuit, it became invisible to the Automatic Train Control (ATC) system.

Collision

At approximately 4:57 pm EDT (20:57 UTC) on Monday, June 22, 2009, Washington Metro Train 112, bound from Glenmont to Shady Grove, left the Takoma station. Minutes later at 5:02 pm, Train 112 rear-ended Train 214, which was stopped between the Takoma and Fort Totten stations while waiting for another train to leave the Fort Totten station. Nine people died, including the operator in the lead car of the moving train, Jeanice McMillan, 42, of Springfield, Virginia; at least 80 people were injured. The death toll makes the crash the deadliest in Metro history.

The NTSB found that Train 214 had come to a stop entirely within the faulty circuit B2-304, making it effectively invisible to the automatic train control (ATC) system. Other trains had received speed commands of 0 when traveling through this circuit, but had enough forward momentum to make it to the next circuit and resume detection and receipt of speed commands from the ATC system. Train 214 was going slower than normal because it was being driven in manual mode by its operator, and it came to a stop while remaining on circuit B2-304 and was therefore invisible. Train 112 behind it was given full speed commands by the ATC to proceed on the track.

A series of near-collisions in 2005 in similar circumstances in the tunnel between Foggy Bottom and Rosslyn stations led to a new test procedure which would have identified the faulty circuit after installation. However, by 2009, Metro engineers were unaware of this incident or the tests developed to detect the failure condition.

Rolling stock involved 

Train 112 (the moving train) was made up of cars 1079, 1078, 1071, 1070, 1130 and 1131—all from the 1000-series. Train 214 (the stationary train) was made up of cars 3036, 3037, 3257, 3256, 5067 and 5066, from the Breda 3000-series and the CAF 5000-series. The cars are equipped with on-board systems called Automatic Train Operation and Automatic Train Control, which allow autonomous operation with little human intervention.

After the collision, WMATA announced a policy of no longer placing the 1000-series at the end of trainsets to prevent telescoping in a collision, as they were the weakest cars structurally. All 1000-series cars were then put in the middle of trainsets and served for another eight years until their retirement in June 2017.

Cars 5066 and 5067 were never repaired and were used for spare parts until all the 5000-series railcars were retired in 2018. 1078 was also retired following the collision.

Response

At 5:20 pm, rescuers first entered car 1079, the lead car of train 112. This car had telescoped over the rear car of the stationary train, trapping many passengers who required rescue by emergency workers using ladders for access. Survivors described the crash as "like... hit[ting] a concrete wall," with air clouded by smoke and debris, and panic among passengers when car doors did not immediately open.

Dennis Oglesby and Martin Griffith, two United States Army soldiers who were in the lead train and were uninjured in the collision, helped passengers evacuate from their train, most of whom appeared to have minor injuries. Oglesby and Griffith then noticed that six to eight people from the other train had been ejected by the force of the collision and were more seriously injured. One person from the overtaking train had been thrown onto the roof of the stationary train and had suffered a severe head wound. The soldiers gave first aid to the more seriously injured victims until help arrived, and informed responding emergency personnel that the rails were still powered and needed to be shut down.

Immediately following the collision, firefighters and paramedics from District of Columbia Fire and Emergency Medical Services were dispatched to the Takoma Metro station, and arrived at the location of the collision soon after.  D.C. Fire Chief Dennis Rubin stated that the initial 9-1-1 emergency calls made the incident seem small, but after firefighters arrived on scene, they dispatched mass casualty incident teams. Within two hours, more than 200 firefighters were on-scene in response to the three-alarm incident. Rescuers worked through the night of June 22, using cranes and heavy rescue equipment to free trapped passengers and search for bodies.

Fire Chief Dennis Rubin initially confirmed four fatalities (including the train operator) and 74 injuries, 14 of which were considered moderate and 6 critical. Five of the dead were discovered in the wreckage and removed from the site of the collision on the morning of June 23, as cranes dismantling the wrecked trains revealed the bodies. Nine fatalities were eventually confirmed. Major General (ret.) David F. Wherley Jr. of the District of Columbia Air National Guard – known for deploying fighter jets to defend Washington, D.C. during the September 11 attacks – died in the collision along with his wife, Ann; the other passengers who died in the crash were Lavonda King, Veronica DuBose, Cameron Williams, Dennis Hawkins, Mary Doolittle, and Ana Fernandez.

According to Daniel Kaniewski, a former George W. Bush administration Homeland Security official now with the Homeland Security Policy Institute at George Washington University, the overall emergency response was "calm and ordered," indicating that U.S. emergency response "during extraordinary incidents [has] significantly improved" since the September 11 attacks.

Service disruption

Immediately following the incident, Red Line services were suspended between the Fort Totten and Takoma stations, and New Hampshire Avenue was closed. Service between the Silver Spring and Rhode Island Ave–Brentwood stations was suspended pending the completion of the initial investigation and the clearing of debris. This section was expected to remain shut down at least through June 23. Service was temporarily increased on the 79 and S9 in response to the accident. Washington Mayor Adrian Fenty said that transportation "all along the East Coast will be significantly impacted," as Amtrak and MARC Trains run on tracks adjacent to the crash site. Bus services were deployed to route Metrorail passengers around the closed track, but area commuting was severely affected. The federal government urged its employees in the Washington Metropolitan Area to remote work on June 23 if possible. The Red Line was projected to be very crowded after resumption of service and the Washington Metropolitan Area Transit Authority (WMATA) advised people to take alternate bus routes. The replacement bus shuttle between the affected stations was expected to be subjected to long delays.

Aftermath

Initial inquiry

Shortly after the incident, WMATA General Manager John Catoe stated that the cause was not known but that "the system is safe." The National Transportation Safety Board (NTSB) began an investigation. WMATA and NTSB investigators considered several possible causes, which might include operator error, brake failure, fault in the computerized signal and operation system, or a combination of the three. During rush hour operation, train movement is typically controlled by a centralized computer system, and a separate decentralized system can automatically apply the brakes to prevent a collision. These systems had failed at least once in the past, and the NTSB subsequently identified incompatible specifications, from the maximum deceleration capability of the trains to the deceleration rates used in the wayside system design.  The train has a manual emergency brake, which can be applied by the driver in the event of an imminent collision, if the driver can see and identify the hazard with sufficient time to stop. Officials indicated that the manual brake was indeed engaged. It is possible that the brake system failed to perform as designed, or that the operator applied the brake too late. The lead car of the moving train was two months overdue for scheduled brake maintenance. In a press conference the evening of June 22, Catoe stated that the last car on the stopped train was a CAF 5000-Series car (car 5066), which entered service in 2001, and that the lead car on the moving train was a Rohr Industries 1000-Series car. WMATA later confirmed that all of the cars on the moving train were 1000-Series.

The 1000-Series entered service in 1976 when the Metro system opened, and were refurbished and had their motors converted from DC to AC propulsion by Breda Costruzioni Ferroviarie in the mid-1990s. In 2006, the NTSB cited the 1000-Series cars as "vulnerable to catastrophic telescoping damage and complete loss of occupant survival space in a longitudinal end-structure collision". It recommended refurbishment of the entire series after a 2004 collision at the Woodley Park station in which a 1000-Series Rohr car telescoped into another train. In this case, NTSB's Hersman confirmed that, "the first car [of the striking train] overrode the rear car [of the struck train], and much of the survivable space on that first car of the striking train was compromised". The NTSB called for the accelerated retirement of the 1000-Series cars, or urged that they be "retrofitted with crashworthiness collision protection that is comparable to 6000-Series car railcars." Additionally, the 1000-Series cars lack data recorders that could be used in determining the cause of a crash. During the press conference, Catoe stated that he had "no basis to suspend the use of 1000-Series cars at this time", but WMATA later announced a decision to stop using the 1000-Series cars as the lead or trailing units of any trains.

On June 24, WMATA issued a press release stating that the agency is "not likely to know the cause for several weeks or months as the investigation unfolds." Twenty-four hours after the incident, the NTSB confirmed that evidence indicated that the emergency brake had been engaged by the operator. Additionally, the striking train was in automatic mode and so the on-board software should have stopped the train.

Hersman said, "These circuits are vital. It's a signal system. It's providing information, authorization and speed commands to the following train," but stopped short of blaming them in this case. WMATA had replaced all 20,000 track circuit relays system-wide in 1999, after a component designed to last 70 years began failing after only 25 years in service, but the agency claims that none of the newer relays had failed prior to this event. WMATA ordered the inspection of all track circuits on its  of track after the NTSB test. On July 23, the NTSB announced that the track circuit at the accident site had been malfunctioning since 2007, 18 months prior to the collision, and WMATA has since found six other circuits within the system that have been behaving unusually. WMATA disabled each circuit that could not be immediately fixed and created an online circuit tracking system, similar to its elevator outage tracker.

NTSB report
The NTSB report on the accident was released on July 27, 2010, and blamed a faulty track circuit, part of the automatic train control system, for causing the crash.  WMATA made a press release detailing changes on July 26 in anticipation of the release of the report.

Memorials

A plaque is located in Fort Totten's mezzanine that commemorates the victims of the crash.

On June 22, 2015, the sixth anniversary of the accident, the Legacy Memorial Park in honor of the victims was opened; ground was broken exactly one year previously by Mayor Vincent C. Gray. The park features a memorial wall and nine inscribed sculptures, one in honor of each person who died in the crash. The sculptures were created by sculptor Barbara Liotta, and the memorial was designed by the firm of Hunt Laudi; the design is titled A Sacred Grove. Representatives of victims' families and city government officials attended the dedication, but Metro officials did not. The park is located at the entrance to Blair Memorial Gardens, which is close to the site of the collision.

The same week as the memorial dedication, the National Transportation Safety Board held hearings related to another fatal incident in the Metro system that happened earlier in 2015; the juxtaposition of the two events was noted by some commentators.

On the third anniversary of the crash, NTSB chairwoman Deborah Hersman and Mayor Gray attended the unveiling of a plaque on the Charles A. Langley Bridge. The bridge crosses the rail tracks at the site of the accident, and a makeshift memorial had been maintained there by victims' families. Another memorial plaque was installed by Metro officials at Fort Totten station.

See also 
 Incidents on the Washington Metro
 November 29, 2009 Washington Metro train collision
 Wrong-side failure

References

Further reading

External links

 Photographs from BBC News
 LunchTalk chat with Metro Ceneral Manager John Catoe, July 2, 2009

2009 disasters in the United States
2009 in Washington, D.C.
Accidental deaths in Washington, D.C.
Accidents and incidents involving Washington Metro
Railway accidents in 2009
Railway accidents and incidents in Washington, D.C.
June 2009 events in the United States
Northeast (Washington, D.C.)
Red Line (Washington Metro)